Canadian (including Canadian Lakes) is a suburb east of the regional city of Ballarat, Victoria, Australia on the rural-urban fringe.

It is primarily a residential area, but has a school, a small shopping area, and several parks and reserves including Canadian Lake and also Sparrow Ground, which has been the subject of much community debate.

The suburb was originally named Canadian Gully after Canadian immigrant gold digger "Captain" Henry Ross, famous for his role in the Eureka Rebellion.

History
Canadian Post Office opened on 1 March 1886 and closed in 1988.

Today
Canadian Lakes, an exclusively residential area was developed in early 2000. This development is built around the Canadian Lake which is surrounded by parklands and walking tracks and is home to an abundance of local birdlife.

Canadian is also the location of Lake Esmond, which was formerly a quarry for Eureka Tile Works until 1982, and later converted into a lake and recreational area that opened on 6 June 1988. Lake Esmond is often used by various Rotary Clubs, and is maintained by the City of Ballarat, and the Rotary Club of East Ballarat.

References

Suburbs of Ballarat